Flandreau may refer to:

Flandreau, South Dakota, a city in Moody County
Flandreau Creek, a river in Minnesota and South Dakota

See also
Flandrau (disambiguation)
Flandreau Santee Sioux Tribe
Flandreau Indian Reservation
Flandrau State Park